Michelle Preston (born 11 November 1978 in Manchester, United Kingdom) is a Muay Thai Fighter and professional boxer. Preston resides in Auckland, New Zealand, where she has fought most of her professional fights. Preston has held many titles including New Zealand National Title, WBA Regional title and WBO Regional title. Preston is also a World title contender, fighting for the IBF World super flyweight title against Argentinian World Champion Debora Anahi Dionicius. Preston is also a Five time World Kickboxing Champion. Preston has fought on four King in the Ring undercards. Preston won her last World title on 17 November 2017 on the Main Undercard of King in the Ring. Preston won the vacant WBC Muaythai World Super Flyweight Champion against Fani Peloumpi by Majority decision.

Kickboxing and Muay Thai 
Preston started Kickboxing when she was 14 years old. On 17 November 2017, Preston took on Fani Peloumpi for the WBC World Muay Thai Super Flyweight title. Preston planned to retire after this fight. Preston won the fight by Majority Decision at Barfoot & Thompson Stadium.

Professional boxing 
In December 2007 she became the first female to win the WBA - PABA title. In November 2008, she became the first female to fight for the WBC - OPBF title, losing to Susie Q Ramadan. In July 2010, she become the first female to win the WBO Asia Pacific title. In November 2010 she became the first female to win a New Zealand national professional title by stoppage.

In July 2012, Preston spoken out about her frustrations with promoters in Boxing. She believes that women boxers are marginalised by promoters and that promoters see as a novelty. In July 2012, Preston received her highed ranking by a major boxing sanctioning body when she reach 2nd on the IBF Super Flyweight rankings. On the 24th of November 2012, Preston had her first attempt at a boxing world title, when she took on Argentina Boxer Débora Dionicius for the IBF World super flyweight title. Preston lost the fight by unanimous decision.

In April 2016, Preston took on Noemi Bosques. This was the first boxing fight for Preston in four years. Preston won the fight by majority decision. On 13 November 2016, Preston fought Débora Dionicius in a rematch for her second attempt at the world title for the World super flyweight title. Leading into the fight Preston was ranked 4th in the IBF, and 20th in the WBC. Preston lost the fight by unanimous decision.

In May 2022, Preston made her in ring return against Holly McMath. The fight was close, but Preston won the fight by Split Decision. Shortly after the fight, it was announced that Preston would take on  Phannaluk Kongsang for the WBA Oceania regional title, however, due to visa issues, the fight was postponed and Preston would fight Nicila Costello instead. Preston won the fight by Unanimous Decision, winning the WBA Oceania title. After the fight, Preston secured the ranking of 5th with the WBA in the Super Flyweight division. In September 2022, Preston took on Thailand boxer Phannaluk Kongsang for the WBA International Super Flyweight title. Preston won the fight by Unanimous Decision. As a result of the fight, Preston received a rating increase of second in the WBA Super Flyweight rankings.

Combat sports titles

Boxing
World Boxing Association 
 Pan Asian Boxing Association Bantamweight title
WBA Oceania Super Flyweight title
WBA International Super Flyweight title
World Boxing Organisation
WBO Asia Pacific super flyweight title
New Zealand National Boxing Federation 
New Zealand National super flyweight title

Kickboxing
World Mauy Thai Council 
World Featherweight Title
International Kickboxing Federation
World Lightweight Title
World Kickboxing Federation 
 World Atomweight Title
New Zealand Flyweight Champion
World Boxing Council Muaythai
World Super Flyweight Champion

Professional boxing record

Personal life
Outside of combat sports, Preston is the Director of Life Plus, a recruitment company for the Health Sector in New Zealand.

Awards 
New Zealand Boxing Awards
2022 New Zealand Fight of the year
2022 Returning Female Boxer of the year

References

External links

Awakening Fighters
Fights rec
Sport & Note

1978 births
Living people
English women boxers
New Zealand women boxers
New Zealand professional boxing champions
Boxers from Manchester
English emigrants to New Zealand
English Muay Thai practitioners
Boxers from Auckland